Craig D'Alton has been  Archdeacon of Melbourne  since 2016: he was previously the vicar of St Mary, North Melbourne.

References

External links
Priest urges end to 'forced' religious education
ARCHDEACON OF MELBOURNE WRITES AGAINST BISHOPS’ MARRIAGE POLICY

Archdeacons of Melbourne
Living people
Year of birth missing (living people)